The Travunian dynasty, or the Belojević' dynasty, was the Serbian ruling family of Travunia, that served the first Serbian Principality under the Vlastimirović dynasty. The progenitor, Beloje, was mentioned as the župan of Travunia in the chapter on the Serbs in De Administrando Imperio of Byzantine Emperor Constantine VII (r. 945–959). Prince Vlastimir (r. 836–851) married his daughter to Beloje's son Krajina, and elevated him to the rank of archon, some time prior the Bulgar–Serb War (839–842). Krajina's descendants were entitled the rule of Travunia under Serbian suzerainty. They ruled the hinterland of Dubrovnik and Boka Kotorska, with seat at Trebinje. The family is mentioned after DAI in the Chronicle of the Priest of Duklja, documenting that a descendant of Hvalimir, Dragomir rules Travunija in the latter half of the 10th century, his brother Petrislav ruling Duklja and his son Stefan Vojislav later ruling Duklja.

Members
Beloje (before 839), lord of Trebinje
Krajina (fl. 847), married the daughter of Vlastimir in 847/848, becomes Župan of Travunia
Hvalimir (late 9th century) 
Čučimir (first half of 10th century) 
Dragomir, rules Travunija the second half of 10th century
Vojislav, lord of Trebinje the first half of 11th century, becomes prince of Duklja in 1018

See also
Vlastimirović dynasty, ruled Serbia 768–969
Vojislavljević dynasty, ruled Serbia 1010–1091, Duklja 1010–1043; Pomorje 1043–1148
Vukanović dynasty, ruled Serbia 1091–1163, Rascia 1060–1163, Pomorje 1148–1163
Pomorje
Belojevići, in Stolac, Bosnia and Herzegovina (part of the family estate)

References

Sources
 
 
 
P. Radonjić, „Velaj“, u: Srpski biografski rečnik, II tom, ur. Čedomir Popov, Novi Sad 2008, str. 109–110.

Andrija Veselinović, Radoš Ljušić, „Srpske dinastije“, Novi Sad, 2001.  (str. 24)
Venance Grumel, La chronologie, Paris 1958, p. 390

Serbian noble families
10th-century Serbian nobility
Medieval Herzegovina
People from Trebinje
9th-century Serbian nobility